Château Certan was an estate in the Bordeaux region of France that was divided into three neighbouring wineries:

Vieux Château Certan
Château Certan de May
Château Certan-Giraud, presently Château Hosanna and Château Certan Marzelle